"Pause" is the first single released from Run–D.M.C.'s fifth studio album, Back from Hell. It was released in 1989 alongside Run-D.M.C.'s version of "Ghostbusters" and was produced by Jam Master Jay and Davy D. "Pause" peaked at number 51 on the Billboard Hot Black Singles chart and number 11 on the Hot Rap Singles chart.

Track listing

A-side
"Ghostbusters" – 6:00 
"Ghostbusters" (Dub Buster) – 4:10

B-side
"Pause" – 6:00 
"Pause" (dub version) – 3:32 
"Pause" (radio version) – 3:46

1989 singles
Run-DMC songs
Songs written by Joseph Simmons
Songs written by Darryl McDaniels
1989 songs
Profile Records singles